Archibald v. Braverman,  (1969), was a case decided by the California Court of Appeals that first ruled that visual perception of an accident was not a necessary prerequisite to recovery for negligent infliction of emotional distress under the criteria enunciated in Dillon v. Legg.  The holding in Archibald was later overruled by the 1989 case Thing v. La Chusa.

See also
 Krouse v. Graham, a case in 1977 with a similar ruling

Notes

References

External links
 

Negligence case law
United States tort case law
1969 in United States case law
California state case law
1969 in California